Vasyl Mykhailovych Horbal (born 18 March 1971) is a Ukrainian politician, former member of the Verkhovna Rada.

In 1993-2002 he worked for various banks in Kyiv and since 1996 as a director of Ukrgasbank. In 2002-2010 Horbal was a member of Verkhovna Rada representing the Party of Regions.

In 2008 he unsuccessfully ran for the mayor of Kyiv.

In April 2010 Horbal was appointed Governor of Lviv Oblast. After being appointed as a governor Horbal was supposed to terminated his parliamentary duty, but instead even though he physically was in Lviv, his card voted on several issues in parliament including the so-called Kharkiv pact. After a secret ballot in which 66 deputies of the Lviv Oblast Council expressed their no-confidence in the Governor, President Viktor Yanukovych dismissed Horbal in December 2010.

References

External links
 Profile at the Official Ukraine Today portal

1971 births
Living people
Politicians from Lviv
Taras Shevchenko National University of Kyiv alumni
Ukrainian bankers
Governors of Lviv Oblast
Fourth convocation members of the Verkhovna Rada
Fifth convocation members of the Verkhovna Rada
Sixth convocation members of the Verkhovna Rada
Party of Regions politicians